Samuil Alekseevich Greig (1827–1887), born into the Greig family, was a full general and adjutant general in the Imperial Russian Army. He served during the Hungarian Revolution of 1848, and during the Crimean War was in Battle of Alma and Battle of Inkerman. He was the State Comptroller from 1874 to 1878, and Minister of Finance of the Russian Empire from 1878 to 1880.

References

External links
 

1827 births
1887 deaths
Military personnel  from Mykolaiv
People from Khersonsky Uyezd
Russian people of Scottish descent
Nobility from the Russian Empire
Politicians of the Russian Empire
Members of the State Council (Russian Empire)
19th-century people from the Russian Empire
Politicians from Mykolaiv